Chemin-A-Haut State Park is a  site located in northern Morehouse Parish, Louisiana. Much of the park is on a high bluff overlooking winding Bayou Bartholomew. Chemin-A-Haut was one of the earliest additions to the Louisiana State Park system.

The Nature Conservancy in Louisiana has recently acquired the  DeBlieux tract, located in a large bend of Bayou Bartholomew, and will eventually transfer the land to the State of Louisiana. Bayou Bartholomew contains over 115 fish species, one of the highest counts of any stream in North America.

Visitors to the park may enjoy camping, fishing, hiking, picnicking and wildlife observation. There is a  equestrian trail for horseback riders. During the hot summer months, guests may cool off in an on-site swimming pool.

References

External links
Chemin-A-Haut State Park - Louisiana Office of State Parks

State parks of Louisiana
Protected areas of Morehouse Parish, Louisiana